Burkhard Pape (born 1932) is a German former professional football player and manager. After a brief playing career as a right winger, Pape became a football coach who spent nearly forty years managing national teams in Africa, Asia, and the Pacific.

Career

Playing career
Born in 1932 in Magdeburg, Pape played as a right winger for Hannover 96, VfR Neumünster and 
FSV Frankfurt.

Coaching career
In June and July 1961, Pape managed a German all-star team called the Baden Amateur All-Stars which toured the northeast United States, winning five out of six games.

Pape became manager Uganda in 1968 after leaving his job coaching Sierra Leone. He left Uganda in August 1972, having won 41 out of the 70 games he had been in charge of. His next big job was as Egypt manager, a position he held from 1975 to 1977.

After leaving Egypt, Pape left Africa and managed teams across Asia and the Pacific, such as Sri Lanka, Indonesia, Thailand, Papua New Guinea and Tuvalu.

Pape returned to Africa to coach Tanzania at the 2000 Four Nation Castle Lager Cup.

References

External links
 Burkhard Pape Interview

1932 births
Living people
Sportspeople from Magdeburg
German footballers
German football managers
German expatriate football managers
West German football managers
Expatriate football managers in Sierra Leone
Sierra Leone national football team managers
Expatriate football managers in Uganda
Uganda national football team managers
Expatriate football managers in Egypt
Egypt national football team managers
Expatriate football managers in Sri Lanka
Sri Lanka national football team managers
Expatriate football managers in Indonesia
Indonesia national football team managers
Expatriate football managers in Thailand
Thailand national football team managers
Expatriate football managers in Papua New Guinea
Papua New Guinea national football team managers
Expatriate football managers in Tanzania
Tanzania national football team managers
1976 African Cup of Nations managers
Association football wingers
Footballers from Saxony-Anhalt
West German expatriate sportspeople in Sierra Leone
West German expatriate sportspeople in Uganda
West German expatriate sportspeople in Egypt
German expatriate sportspeople in Sri Lanka
German expatriate sportspeople in Indonesia
German expatriate sportspeople in Thailand
German expatriate sportspeople in Papua New Guinea
German expatriate sportspeople in Tanzania
West German expatriate football managers